Radio Libertaire is an FM French radio station of the Anarchist Federation (FA) in Paris, France transmitting on 89.4 MHZ.

It was founded in 1981. By 1998 it had become one of the ten most popular stations in the Paris region.

References

External links

 Radio Libertaire Live Stream

Anarchist culture
Pirate radio stations
Anarchist organizations in France
Radio stations in France
Radio in Paris
French Anarchist Federations
Radio stations established in 1981